Nathan Stanton (born 4 May 1981) is an English former professional footballer who is currently kit manager at former team Scunthorpe United.

In his 17-year-long playing career, Stanton spent most of his career with his first club Scunthorpe United with whom he signed in 1998, going on to appear in 243 official games. Apart from Scunthorpe United, Stanton has previously played for Rochdale, Burton Albion, and Grantham Town. In 2014, Corby Town.

Club career

Scunthorpe United
Born in Nottingham, Stanton began his career with Scunthorpe United, A former Scunthorpe United trainee, he scored one goal for the club, his strike coming against Lincoln City in the 2003 League Two Play Off Semi Final. Injuries limited his appearances for the club, and he was released on a free transfer in the summer of 2006.

Rochdale
In 2006, Rochdale quickly snapped him up, and he instantly established himself as part the first team, even becoming vice captain.

Burton Albion
Stanton joined Burton Albion in July 2010, after he rejected the offer of a new deal from Rochdale. After 62 appearances in 3 seasons, Stanton was released at the end of the 2012–2013 season.

Grantham Town
He joined Grantham Town ahead of the 2013/14 Northern Premier League season, where he was named as an unused sub on the opening day.

Corby Town
Stanton joined Corby Town in January 2014. He made his Corby Town debut away at Weymouth.

Honours
Individual
PFA Team of the Year: 2003–04 Third Division

References

External links

rochdaleafc.co.uk player profile

1981 births
Living people
Association football defenders
English footballers
Rochdale A.F.C. players
Scunthorpe United F.C. players
Burton Albion F.C. players
Grantham Town F.C. players
Corby Town F.C. players
English Football League players
Scunthorpe United F.C. non-playing staff